Inline hockey was introduced as a World Games sport for men at the World Games 2005 in Duisburg where it replaced roller hockey.

Medalists

Men

External links
World Games - Inline hockey at Sports123 by Internet Archive
2013 Cali Competition Information System

Sports at the World Games
Inline hockey